The 21st Cannes Film Festival was to have been held from 10 to 24 May 1968, before being curtailled due to the turmoil of May 1968 in France.

Background
This edition was marked by the previous controversy around the Langlois affair. On February 9, 1968 a meeting of the board of directors of the Cinémathèque Française (a non-profit organization), in which the representatives of the Ministry of Culture and of the Centre national du cinéma et de l'image animée (which depended on the latter) decided to remove Henri Langlois, director and co-founder of the Cinémathèque, from his position. Even though they were not a majority, Langlois supporters such as François Truffaut refused to cast their vote. André Malraux, the French Minister of Culture, had prompted this decision because he wanted to implement managerial changes to gain more influence in the institution. After another vote Pierre Barbin, director of the Tours and Annecy film festivals, became the new director.

Langlois was a very popular and beloved figure and this decision sparked a number of protests and demonstrations by filmmakers of the French New Wave, as well as actors, critics and fans who demonstrated in front of the Cinémathèque at the Palais de Chaillot on February 12. Many internationally acclaimed film directors like Charles Chaplin, Stanley Kubrick, Roberto Rossellini, Orson Welles and Luis Buñuel also sent letters in support of Langlois and even threatened to retrieve the copies of their films previously given to the Cinemathéque. On February 14, another demonstration took place but this time artists were joined by Sorbonne University students in what was a prelude of what was going to happen in the following months. French filmmakers decided to form the Committee for the Defense of the Cinémathèque. At this point, the issue was no longer cultural and had become political.

After long negotiations, on April 22, a special meeting of the general assembly of the Cinémathèque was called and voted to reinstate Langlois, with the approval of Malraux who also pulled the government's representatives from the assembly but in exchange cut public funding to a minimum.

The Festival
The festival opened on May 10 with the 70 mm restored version of Gone with the Wind, directed by Victor Fleming. American film actress and Princess of Monaco, Grace Kelly served as the host of the opening and closing ceremonies.

Personalities of French cinema were sensitive to the demonstrations which were taking place in Paris. On the night of May 10 to May 11,  violent clashes between students and the police took place in the Latin Quarter in what became the first night of the barricades. Following these incidents, the French Critics Association issued a statement asking the participants of the festival to join the demonstration of support for striking students scheduled on May 13 and called for the suspension of the festival and for those in Cannes to support the students in their "protest against the violent police repression which is an assault on the nation's cultural liberty, the secular traditions of its universities and its democratic principles". However, the organization refused.

On May 17, in Paris the États généraux du cinéma, a general assembly of cinema professionals, called for the Cannes Festival to be stopped. Peter Lennon's documentary Rocky Road to Dublin was screened at the festival. It was the last film to be shown.

The next day on May 18, a panel discussion of the members of the Committee for the Defense of the Cinémathèque was organized to discuss the Langlois affair, with the presence of directors Jean-Luc Godard, Jean-Gabriel Albicocco, Claude Berri and actor Jean-Pierre Léaud. The discussions were lively and François Truffaut, who had arrived from Paris the day before, explained that while the trains are blocked and the factories on strike, it would be ridiculous to continue the festival. Jean-Luc Godard believed that with this interruption, the cinema will show its solidarity with the student movements. Claude Lelouch, Jean-Claude Carrière, actress Macha Méril as well as jury members Louis Malle and Roman Polanski, joined them to announce in a press conference in the salle Jean Cocteau at the old Palais Croisette that, in solidarity with the workers and the students who were protesting across France, the festival had to be put to an end. Subsequently, Louis Malle, Monica Vitti, Roman Polanski, and Terence Young resigned from the international jury while Alain Resnais, Claude Lelouch, Carlos Saura, and Miloš Forman asked for the withdrawal of their films of the competition. Louis Malle announced that "the jury is out of state to work".

Polanski was skeptical of these measures because those methods reminded him of what Communists did in his native Poland but ended up supporting the annulment of that year's festival. Also, jury member Vsevolod Rozhdestvensky, a poet from the Soviet Union, considered the idea of cancelling the festival so heinous that he even refused to attend the emergency jury meeting. Director Robert Favre Le Bret claimed: "We will close the festival tomorrow at midday".

That same evening, Peppermint Frappé by Carlos Saura, was the only film pending to be screened. Saura, accompanied by his then girlfriend and protagonist of the film, Geraldine Chaplin, did not want his own film to be watched. However, despite his total opposition the projection began. Saura and Chaplin jumped onstage and yelled asking not to start the projector to the audience's shock. As Favre Le Bret gave the order to open the big curtain that covered the screen, Saura and Chaplin decided to hung on from the curtains to prevent them from pulling back. At this point, they were joined by Truffaut and Godard. The film was not shown and this started a heated discussion and then a physical altercation with the audience who wanted to watch the film.

As a punishment for all his actions, Truffaut was later declared persona non grata by the organization. Finally on May 19 at 12 p.m. and five days before the established end of the festival, the board of directors led by Robert Favre Le Bret voted unanimously to cancel this edition, not awarding any prize. From the 28 films that were selected to compete for the Grand Prix du Festival International du Film, only 11 were screened.

Jury 
The following people were appointed as the Jury of the 1968 feature film competition:

Feature films
André Chamson (France) - Jury President
Monica Vitti (Italy)
Claude Aveline (France)
Boris von Borresholm (West Germany)
Veljko Bulajić (Yugoslavia)
Paul Cadeac d'Arbaud (France)
Jean Lescure (France)
Louis Malle (France)
Jan Nordlander (Sweden)
Roman Polanski (Poland)
Robert Rozhdestvensky (Soviet Union)
Terence Young (United Kingdom)

Official selection

In competition - Feature film
The following films were due to compete for the Grand Prix du Festival International du Film:

 Seduto alla sua destra by Valerio Zurlini
 Vingt-quatre heures de la vie d'une femme by Dominique Delouche
 Anna Karenina by Aleksandr Zarkhi
 Banditi a Milano by Carlo Lizzani
 Charlie Bubbles by Albert Finney
 Csillagosok, katonák by Miklós Jancsó
 Das Schloß by Rudolf Noelte
 Doktor Glas by Mai Zetterling
 Feldobott kö by Sándor Sára
 Fényes szelek by Miklós Jancsó
 Grazie, zia by Salvatore Samperi
 Here We Go Round the Mulberry Bush by Clive Donner
 Hoří, má panenko by Miloš Forman
 I protagonisti by Marcello Fondato
 Je t'aime, je t'aime by Alain Resnais
 Joanna by Mike Sarne
 Les Gauloises bleues by Michel Cournot
 Mali vojnici by Bahrudin Čengić
 O slavnosti a hostech by Jan Němec
 Peppermint Frappé by Carlos Saura
 Petulia by Richard Lester
 Rozmarné léto by Jiří Menzel
 Tuvia Vesheva Benotav by Menahem Golan
 The Girl on a Motorcycle by Jack Cardiff
 The Long Day's Dying by Peter Collinson
 Trilogy by Frank Perry
 Yabu no naka no kuroneko by Kaneto Shindō
 Zywot Mateusza by Witold Leszczyński

Films out of competition
The following films were selected to be screened out of competition:
 Gone with the Wind by Victor Fleming
 Spirits of the Dead by Roger Vadim, Louis Malle and Federico Fellini

Parallel sections

International Critics' Week
The following feature films were selected to be screened for the 7th International Critics' Week (7e Semaine de la Critique):

 Angèle (Quatre d’entre elles) by Yves Yersin (Switzerland)
 Concerto pour un exil by Désiré Ecaré (France, Ivory Coast)
 The Edge by Robert Kramer (United States)
 Les enfants de Néant by Michel Brault (France)
 Falling Leaves (Giorgobistve) by Otar Iosseliani (Soviet Union)
 How Long Does a Man Live? (Meddig él az ember?) by Judit Elek (Hungary)
 Marie pour mémoire by Philippe Garrel (France)
 On Paper Wings (Na papirnatih avionih) by Matjaz Klopcic (Yugoslavia)
 The Queen by Frank Simon (United States)
 Rocky Road to Dublin by Peter Lennon (Ireland)

Not presented because of the interruption of the festival:
 Chronik der Anna Magdalena Bach by Jean-Marie Straub (West Germany)
 Revolution by Jack O’Connell (United States)

Aftermath 
The protests that led to the cancelling of this edition of the festival also brought some changes. On June 14, 1968, French filmmakers like François Truffaut and Louis Malle, among others, took the opportunity to found the Société des Réalisateurs de Films (SRF) with the mission of "defending artistic, moral and professional and economic freedoms of cinematographic creation and participating in the development of new structures of the cinema". In the next year's edition of the festival, it started to organize a parallel selection to the official one called Directors' Fortnight.

In the 2008 edition, forty years later, some of the works that could not be screened at the time were restored: Peppermint Frappé by Carlos Saura, 24 Hours in the Life of a Woman by Dominique Delouche, Anna Karenina by Alexandre Zarkhi and The Long Day's Dying by Peter Collinson. 13 jours en France by Claude Lelouch and François Reichenbach was also shown even though it was not part of the official selection.

See also
 20th Berlin International Film Festival

References

Media
Institut national de l'audiovisuel: Cannes Festival, May 1968 (commentary in French) Jean-Luc Godard, Roman Polanski, François Truffaut and Louis Malle lead the debate to answer the question: should we stop the festival? Favre le Bret Robert, President of the Festival, announces the festival closed. (duration 10′25″)

External links 
1968 Cannes Film Festival (web.archive)
Official website Retrospective 1968 
21ème Festival International du Film - Cannes

Cannes Film Festival, 1968
Cannes Film Festival, 1968
Cannes Film Festival